The following is an alphabetical list of topics related to the nation of Jamaica.

0–9

.jm – Internet country code top-level domain for Jamaica

A
Administrative divisions of Jamaica
Air Force of Jamaica
Airports in Jamaica
Americas
North America
North Atlantic Ocean
West Indies
Caribbean Sea
Antilles
Greater Antilles
Islands of Jamaica
Anglo-America
Antilles
Army of Jamaica
Atlas of Jamaica

B
Birds of Jamaica
Black River, Jamaica

C
Cabinet of Jamaica
Capital of Jamaica:  Kingston
Caribbean
Caribbean Community (CARICOM)
Caribbean Sea
Categories:
:Category:Jamaica

:Category:Buildings and structures in Jamaica
:Category:Communications in Jamaica
:Category:Economy of Jamaica
:Category:Education in Jamaica
:Category:Environment of Jamaica
:Category:Geography of Jamaica
:Category:Government of Jamaica
:Category:Health in Jamaica
:Category:History of Jamaica
:Category:Jamaica portal
:Category:Jamaica stubs
:Category:Jamaican culture
:Category:Jamaican people
:Category:Jamaica-related lists
:Category:Law of Jamaica
:Category:Military of Jamaica
:Category:Politics of Jamaica
:Category:Science and technology in Jamaica
:Category:Society of Jamaica
:Category:Sport in Jamaica
:Category:Transport in Jamaica

commons:Category:Jamaica
Cities of Jamaica
Clarendon Parish, Jamaica
Climate of Jamaica
Coat of arms of Jamaica
Commonwealth of Nations
Commonwealth realm of Jamaica
Communications in Jamaica
Companies in Jamaica
Cornwall, Jamaica
Cricket in the West Indies
Cuisine of Jamaica
Culture of Jamaica

D
Demographics of Jamaica
Diplomatic missions in Jamaica
Diplomatic missions of Jamaica
Jamaican dishes and foods

E
Economy of Jamaica
Education in Jamaica
Effects of Hurricane Charley in Jamaica
Elections in Jamaica
English colonization of the Americas
English language

F

Falmouth, Jamaica
Flag of Jamaica
Foods of Jamaica
List of Foods of Jamaica
Football in Jamaica
Football clubs in Jamaica
Foreign relations of Jamaica

G
Geography of Jamaica
Government of Jamaica
Governor-General of Jamaica
Greater Antilles
Gross domestic product
Gun Court

H
Half Way Tree
Hanover Parish, Jamaica
Health care in Jamaica
Hinduism in Jamaica
History of Jamaica

I
International Organization for Standardization (ISO)
ISO 3166-1 alpha-2 country code for Jamaica: JM
ISO 3166-1 alpha-3 country code for Jamaica: JAM
ISO 3166-2:JM region codes for Jamaica
Internet in Jamaica
Islam in Jamaica
Islands of Jamaica:

Jamaica island
Big Pelican Island
Bogue Islands
Booby Cay
Bumpduklok
Dolphin Island, Jamaica
Emerald Island, Jamaica
Great Goat Island
Gun Cay
Kokomo Island
Lime Cay
Little Goat Island
Little Half Moon Cay
Little Pelican Island
Maiden Cay
Monkey Island, Jamaica
Morant Cays
Navy Island, Jamaica
One Bush Cay
Pedro Cays
Pigeon Island, Jamaica
Princess Island, Jamaica
Salt Island, Jamaica
Tower Island (Tower Isle)

J
Jamaica
Jamaica at the Olympics
Jamaica Defence Force
"Jamaica, Land We Love"
Jamaica Stock Exchange
Jamaican athletics
Jamaican diaspora
Jamaican dishes and foods
Jamaican (language)
Jamaican literature
Jamaica Society of Energy Engineers

K
Kingston – Capital of Jamaica
Kingston Parish, Jamaica

L
Languages of Jamaica
Law enforcement in Jamaica
LGBT rights in Jamaica
Lists related to Jamaica:

Diplomatic missions of Jamaica
List of airports in Jamaica
List of birds of Jamaica
List of cities and towns in Jamaica
List of companies of Jamaica
List of countries by GDP (nominal)
List of diplomatic missions in Jamaica
List of football clubs in Jamaica
List of islands of Jamaica
List of Jamaica women ODI cricketers
List of Jamaicans
List of Jamaica-related topics
List of Jamaican dishes and foods
List of Jamaican inventions and discoveries
List of lighthouses in Jamaica
List of mountains of Jamaica
List of National Heritage Sites in Jamaica
List of non-Jamaicans who have served Jamaica
List of political parties in Jamaica
List of prisons in Jamaica
List of railway stations in Jamaica
List of rivers of Jamaica
List of schools in Jamaica
List of wettest known tropical cyclones in Jamaica
List of World Heritage Sites in Jamaica
Topic outline of Jamaica

Lucea
Limón Province, Costa Rica

M
Manchester Parish, Jamaica
Mandeville, Jamaica
May Pen
Michari
Middlesex, Jamaica
Military history of Jamaica
Military of Jamaica
Monarchy of Jamaica
Montego Bay
Morant Bay
Mountains of Jamaica
Music of Jamaica

N
National anthem of Jamaica
North America
Northern Hemisphere

O
Ocho Ríos

P
Patois
Parishes of Jamaica
Parliament of Jamaica
Political parties in Jamaica
Politics of Jamaica
Port Antonio
Port Maria
Portland Parish, Jamaica
Portmore, Jamaica
Prime Minister of Jamaica
Prisons in Jamaica
Prostitution in Jamaica
Public holidays in Jamaica

Q

R
Ras Droppa
Rastafari
Reggae
Rivers of Jamaica
Roads in Jamaica

S
Saint Andrew Parish, Jamaica
Saint Ann Parish, Jamaica
Saint Catherine Parish, Jamaica
Saint Elizabeth Parish, Jamaica
Saint James Parish, Jamaica
Saint Mary Parish, Jamaica
Saint Thomas Parish, Jamaica
Savanna-la-Mar
Senate of Jamaica
Smile Jamaica television talk show
Spanish Town
States headed by Elizabeth II
Surrey, Jamaica

T
Transport in Jamaica
Trelawny Parish, Jamaica
Tropical cyclones in Jamaica

U
United Nations, member state since 1962
United States-Jamaica relations
Universities and colleges in Jamaica

V

W
Water supply and sanitation in Jamaica
West Indies
Western Hemisphere
Westmoreland Parish, Jamaica

Wikipedia:WikiProject Topic outline/Drafts/Topic outline of Jamaica
World Heritage Sites in Jamaica

X

Y

Z

See also

Commonwealth of Nations
List of Caribbean-related topics
List of international rankings
Lists of country-related topics
Topic outline of geography
Topic outline of Jamaica
Topic outline of North America
United Nations

References

External links

 
Jamaica